Events in the year 2023 in Iceland.

Incumbents 

 President: Guðni Th. Jóhannesson
 Prime Minister: Katrín Jakobsdóttir
 Althing: 2021-present Althing
 Speaker of the Althing: Birgir Ármannsson
 President of the Supreme Court: Karl Axelsson

Events

Sports 

 2022–23 Úrvalsdeild karla (basketball)
 2022–23 Úrvalsdeild kvenna (basketball)
 UEFA Euro 2024 qualifying Group J

References 

 
2020s in Iceland
Years of the 21st century in Iceland
Iceland
Iceland